Csaba Hegedűs may refer to:

 Csaba Hegedűs (wrestler) (born 1948), Hungarian Greco-Roman wrestler 
 Csaba Hegedűs (footballer) (born 1985), Hungarian footballer